T. P. Ramakrishnan is an Indian politician from the state of Kerala. He started his political work through Kerala Students Federation. At present, he served as the Minister for Excise and Labour in the first Pinarayi Vijayan ministry.

Achievements as the Minister for Labour and Excise in Kerala

Awaz Health Insurance Scheme
Office Labour Ministry of Kerala under T.P. Ramakrishnan announced its Health Insurance Scheme to migrant workers in Kerala. Free treatment worth Rs. 15000 and health insurance with accidental coverage will be provided for workers registering under this scheme named as Awaz Health Insurance Scheme in Kerala. The insurance scheme, which will be renewed every year, was well received by the migrant worker community in Kerala. In 2015, the number of migrants in the state stood at 25 lakh. As per a study conducted by International Journal of Commerce, Business and Management in 2016, about 60% of these labourers work in construction sites and the rest in the hospitality, manufacturing, trade and agriculture sectors. A study by Kerala Institute of Labour and Employment in 2016, revealed that 87% of these migrant labourers did not have health insurance.

Vimukthi de-addiction mission
The CPI(M) led LDF government in Kerala announced Vimukthi mission which aims to create awareness among the youth against substance abuse. Former Indian cricketer Sachin Tendulkar inaugurated the mission activities on 8 November 2016.

See also 
 Kerala Council of Ministers

References

External links

Malayali politicians
People from Kozhikode district
1949 births
Living people
India MPs 1977–1979
Kerala MLAs 2016–2021
Kerala MLAs 2006–2011